Julien Green (September 6, 1900 – August 13, 1998) was an American writer who authored several novels (The Dark Journey, The Closed Garden, Moira, Each Man in His Darkness, the Dixie trilogy, etc.), a four-volume autobiography (The Green Paradise, The War at Sixteen, Love in America and Restless Youth) and his famous Diary (in nineteen volumes, 1919–1998). He wrote primarily in French and was the first non-French national to be elected to the Académie française.

Biography
Julian Hartridge Green was born to American parents in Paris, a descendant on his mother's side of a Confederate Senator, Julian Hartridge (1829–1879), who later served as a Democratic Representative from Georgia to the US Congress, and who was Julien Green's namesake. (Green was christened "Julian"; his French publisher changed the spelling to "Julien" in the 1920s.)

The youngest of eight children born to Protestant parents, he had a puritanical and overprotective upbringing, his mother being  sexually repressive. Green received a Calvinist education in his religious education as a child, but became a Roman Catholic in 1916, two years after his mother's death. The following year, still only 16, he volunteered his services as an ambulanceman in the American Field Service. When his age was discovered his enlistment was annulled. He immediately signed up with an ambulance unit of the American Red Cross, and when that six-month term of service ended in 1918, he enlisted in the French Army, in which he served as a second lieutenant of artillery until 1919.  After the war, he spent three years (1919–22) at the University of Virginia at the invitation of his uncle—his mother's brother—Walter Hartridge. It was his first direct encounter with the United States. He discovered the South, where both his parents had been born. He returned to France in 1922, where, after a false start as a painter, he began his career as a French writer, and by 1927 had established himself in the world of French literature.  His career as a major figure of 20th-century French literature began soon after his return from the United States with the novel Mont-Cinère (1926), which was well received by Georges Bernanos. 
In July 1940, after France's defeat, he went back to America. In 1942, he was mobilized and sent to New York to work at the United States Office of War Information.  From there, for almost a year, five times a week, he would address France as part of the radio broadcasts of Voice of America, working inter alia with André Breton and Yul Brynner.  Green returned to France after World War II.

Julien Green died in Paris shortly before his 98th birthday and is entombed in a chapel designed for him in St. Egid Church, Klagenfurt, Austria. His name on the tomb uses the original English spelling "Julian" instead of the French "Julien".

Writing

Most of Green's books focused on the ideas of faith and religion as well as hypocrisy.  Several dealt with the southern United States, and he strongly identified with the fate of the Confederacy, characterizing himself throughout his life as a "Sudiste" (southerner). He inherited this version of patriotism from his mother, who came from a distinguished southern family. Some years before Julien's birth, when Julien's father was offered a choice of posts (with his bank) in either Germany or France, Julien's mother urged the choice of France on the grounds that the French were "also a proud people, recently defeated in war, and we shall understand one another." The reference was to France's 1871 defeat in the Franco-Prussian War. 

In France, both during his life and today, Green's reputation rests principally not on his novels, but on his diary, published in nineteen volumes, and spanning the years 1919 to 1998. These volumes provide a chronicle of his literary and religious life, and a unique window on the artistic and literary scene in Paris over a span of eighty years. Green's style, austere and employing to great effect the passé simple, a literary tense nearly abandoned by many of his French contemporaries, found favor with the Académie française. Green resigned from the Académie shortly before his death, citing his American heritage and loyalties.

While Green wrote primarily in the French language, he also wrote in English. He translated some of his own works from French to English, sometimes with the help of his sister, Anne Green, an author herself. A collection of some of his translations is published in Le langage et son double, with a side-by-side English–French format, facilitating direct comparison. Despite his being bilingual, Green's texts remain largely unknown in the English-speaking world. Thus far three of his books have been turned into films:  (1962), for which he wrote the screenplay, is the most famous. Adrienne Mesurat (1953), and La Dame de pique (1965) were also adapted to film.   His stage play South (Sud, 1953) was adapted for a British television production in 1959, and is the earliest known television drama dealing with homosexuality.

Relationships and legacy

For many years Green was the companion of Robert de Saint-Jean, a journalist, whom he had met in the 1920s. In his later years, Green formally adopted the gay fiction writer Éric Jourdan. According to Jourdan, Green decided to move to a house that had once belonged to Caterina Sforza in Forlì, Italy, in 1994. However, Green did not move to the house because his health was failing. 

At the Académie française, Green succeeded François Mauriac, taking chair number 22 on June 3, 1971. In 1996, he resigned from the Académie which caused a minor scandal. However, he was only formally replaced upon his death.

It was commonly believed he had dual citizenship, but although he was born in Paris and wrote almost exclusively in the French language, he never became a French citizen. President Georges Pompidou reportedly offered him French citizenship in 1972, but Green declined.

Works

Journal (Diary, 1919–98, nineteen volumes published in Paris, France, from 1938 to 2001)
 English translations of selected entries:Personal Record 1928 - 1939, trans. Jocelyn Godefroi, Hamish Hamilton 1940Diary 1928 - 1957, trans. Anne Green, Collins Harvill 1964 (includes some duplication of entries in the Godefroi translation)
Pamphlet contre les catholiques de France (1924)
Mont-Cinère (Avarice House, 1926)
Suite anglaise (1927)
Le voyageur sur la terre (1927)
Adrienne Mesurat (The Closed Garden, 1927)
Un puritain homme de lettres (1928)
Léviathan (The Dark Journey, 1929)
L'autre sommeil (The Other Sleep, 1930)
Épaves (The Strange River, 1932)
Le visionnaire (The Dreamer, 1934)
Minuit (Midnight, 1936)
Varouna (Then Shall the Dust Return, 1940)
Memories of Happy Days (1942)
Si j'étais vous... (If I Were You, 1947)
Moïra (Moira, 1950)
Sud (South, 1953,  a play)
L'ennemi (1954, a play)
Le malfaiteur (The Transgressor, 1956)

L'ombre (1956, a play)
Chaque homme dans sa nuit (Each Man in His Darkness, 1960)
Partir avant le jour (To Leave Before Dawn / The Green Paradise, 1963)
Mille chemins ouverts (The War at Sixteen, 1964)
Terre lointaine (Love in America, 1966)
Jeunesse (Restless Youth, 1974)
L'autre (The Other One, 1971)
Qui sommes-nous ? (1972)
La liberté (1974)
Memories of Evil Days (1976)
La Nuit des fantômes (1976)
Le Mauvais lieu (1977)
Ce qu'il faut d'amour à l'homme (1978)
Dans la gueule du temps (1979)
God's Fool: The Life and Times of Francis of Assisi (1983)
Paris (1984)
Les Pays lointains (The Distant Lands, Dixie I, 1987)
Les Étoiles du Sud (The Stars of the South, Dixie II, 1989)
Dixie (Dixie III, 1994)

See also
Jocelyn Godefroi
List of ambulance drivers during World War I

References

Sources
Michael O'Dwyer, "Georgia History in Fiction: The Quest for Identity in the Civil War Novels of Julien Green", Georgia Historical Society, 1998

Further reading
Julien Green: Religion and Sensuality, Anthony H. Newbury. Editions Rodopi (1986).

External links

 Julien Green (1900–1998) 
 Julian Green's Spirituality of Writing
 Julian Green: Modern Gothic
 Newbury, Anthony H. Julien Green: Religion and Sensuality
 Wildgen, Julien Green.
 The Motive of Self-Discovery in Julien Green
 

1900 births
1998 deaths
20th-century American novelists
American expatriates in France
American people of Scottish descent
American people of Irish descent
American male novelists
American Field Service personnel of World War I
American Roman Catholics
American writers in French
Converts to Roman Catholicism from Calvinism
American gay writers
LGBT Roman Catholics
French gay writers
Members of the Académie Française
University of Virginia alumni
Writers from Paris
American LGBT novelists
Translators from French
Translators from English
Members of the Académie royale de langue et de littérature françaises de Belgique
20th-century American male writers
People of the United States Office of War Information
20th-century translators
20th-century English LGBT people
French LGBT novelists
Members of the American Academy of Arts and Letters